Vida Loca is the first studio album by Cuban singer-songwriter Francisco Céspedes, released on August 1997 by WEA Latina. It was nominated for Pop Album of the Year by a New Artist at the 1999 Billboard Latin Music Awards, but lost to Carlos Ponce. By June 2000, the record had sold over 1.5 million copies worldwide.

History
In August 1997 Céspedes released his debut album, and the first single "Se me Antoja". The album languished selling no more than 10,000 copies by year's end. The things changed when network TV Azteca held a contest to find the title track for a new soap, . Céspedes submitted a song written specifically for that purpose, and out of hundreds, it got picked. "Señora," the song, became the title track of Señora, the soap, and it was added as a bonus track to Vida Loca in the second edition, the single sold 10,000 copies in Mexico. By year's end, the album had sold 180,000 copies in Mexico alone, and Cespedes was on his way to becoming an international star.

After seeing Céspedes perform in Mexico City, Alejandro Sanz persuaded Warner Music Spain president Saul Tagarro to promote Céspedes' CD "Vida Loca" in Spain. By mid-December 1998, "Vida Loca" had sold 350,000 units, and was eventually awarded with five platinum certifications by PROMUSICAE for shipping over 500,000 copies. In addition, Cespedes, won one Premio Ondas and three , including one for the best Latin album.

Track listing

Personnel
Adapted from the Vida Loca liner notes:

Performance credits

Waldo Madera – drums, percussion
Agustin Bernal – double bass
Raúl del Sol – acoustic piano , chorus
Eugenio Toussaint – acoustic piano 
Jorge Aragón – acoustic piano 
Fernando Otero – piano  
Dean Parks – steel acoustic guitar
Freddy Ramos – nylon acoustic guitar
Gil Gutiérrez – guitar
Chilo Morán – trumpet 
Fernando Acosta – saxophone
Yomo Toro – cuatro 
Alcira Herrera – chorus
Maryori González – chorus
Elizabeth Meza – chorus
Pancho – chorus
Aneiro – chorus
Silantiva Vera – strings
Jorge Deletze – strings
Bozena Slawinska – strings
Matthew Paul Schubring – strings
Viktoria Horti – strings
Naomi Eve Brickman – strings
Abraham Mayer – strings
Vladimir Tokarev – strings

Technical credits

Juan Carlos Paz y Puente – executive producer, direction A&R
Aneiro Taño – co-producer, arrangements
Salvador Tercero – engineer, mixing engineer
Raúl Durand – assistant
Jean B. Smit – mixing engineer
Andy Richter – assistant
Leon Zervos – mastering engineer
Ron McMaster – mastering engineer 
Eugenio Toussaint – arrangements  
Manolo González Loyola – arrangements
Mark Kamins – direction A&R
Edgar Ladrón de Guevara – photography
Jessica Fallon – graphic design
Lidia Salazar – coordination in Mexico
Laura Cárdenas – coordination in Mexico
Maricela Valencia – coordination in Mexico
Nina Swan – coordination in Los Angeles
Freddy Ramos – coordination in Los Angeles
Raúl Ortega Alfonso – exergues

Recording and mixing locations

Estudio 19, Mexico City – recording
Westlake Recording Studios – Studio A, Los Angeles, CA – mixing
Mad Hatter Studios, Los Angeles, CA – mixing 
Absolute Audio – mastering
Capitol Mastering, Los Angeles, CA – mastering

Charts

Weekly charts

Year-end charts

Sales and certifications

References 

1997 debut albums
Spanish-language albums
Warner Music Latina albums